Liu Cigui (born 18 September 1955) is a Chinese politician. He is the current Communist Party Secretary of Hainan province. His former positions include Governor of Hainan, Director of the State Oceanic Administration and China Coast Guard and Mayor of Xiamen and Longyan in Fujian province.

Life and career
Liu Cigui was born on 18 September 1955 in Hui'an County, Quanzhou, Fujian province. In 1973, during the late Cultural Revolution, he worked as a sent-down youth (zhiqing) in Shaowu County's Hongdun Commune.

Starting in October 1976, Liu worked at various levels of government in Fujian, first as the Communist Youth League secretary of Hongdun Commune and then rising to deputy Communist Party chief of Shaowu in 1983. He became the deputy party chief of Guangze County in February 1986 and party chief in October 1988. In March 1993, Liu became the deputy secretary of the Communist Youth League of Fujian. From 1997 to 2000, he worked in the prefecture-level city of Putian, serving as its executive deputy mayor starting in August 1998. He was appointed director of the province's Oceanic and Fishery Bureau in March 2000, studying oceanography at the graduate school of Xiamen University from September 2000 to July 2002 while on the job. In May 2002, Liu was appointed acting mayor and then mayor of Longyan. From 2007 to 2011, he served as mayor of the sub-provincial city of Xiamen.

On 1 February 2011, Liu Cigui was appointed Director of the State Oceanic Administration, part of the Ministry of Land and Resources. In December 2014, he was appointed deputy party chief of Hainan province and, on 4 January 2015, he was appointed Acting Governor of Hainan, replacing the outgoing governor Jiang Dingzhi.

On 1 April 2017, Liu Cigui was appointed as the Communist Party Secretary of Hainan.

Liu was a member of the 18th Central Commission for Discipline Inspection (CCDI) and is a member of the 19th Central Committee of the Communist Party of China.

References

1955 births
Living people
Chinese Communist Party politicians from Fujian
People's Republic of China politicians from Fujian
Political office-holders in Fujian
Politicians from Quanzhou
Governors of Hainan
State Oceanic Administration
Mayors of Xiamen
Xiamen University alumni
Members of the 19th Central Committee of the Chinese Communist Party
Delegates to the 13th National People's Congress
Delegates to the 12th National People's Congress
Delegates to the 11th National People's Congress
Delegates to the 10th National People's Congress